English singer FKA Twigs has a total of 17 awards and 39 nominations.

She has won a MOBO Award, two UK Music Video Awards, two Music Producers Guild Awards, one YouTube Music Awards, a The South Bank Sky Arts Awards and an AIM Independent Music Awards. In addition to her wins, FKA twigs has been nominated for two Brit Awards, eight MTV Video Music Awards, and one BET Award. Her single "Cellophane" received a Grammy Award nomination for Best Music Video.

A2IM Libera Awards 
The A2IM Libera Awards is an annual music awards show created by the American Association of Independent Music.
{| class="wikitable" style="width:85%;"
|-
! width=5%|Year
! style="width:40%;"| Category
! style="width:40%;"| Nominated work
! style="width:10%;"| Result
!width=5%|
|-
| rowspan="4"|2015
| Album of the Year
| rowspan="2"|LP1
| 
| rowspan="4" align="center"|
|-
| Groundbreaking Album of the Year
| 
|-
| Video of the Year
| "Two Weeks"
| 
|-
| Best Sync Usage
| "Video Girl" in Google Glass commercial
| 
|-
| 2016
| Video of the Year
| M3LL155X
| 
|align="center"|
|-
| rowspan=4|2020
| Album of the Year
| rowspan=3|Magdalene
| 
|rowspan=4 align="center"|
|-
| Best R&B Album
| 
|-
| Marketing Genius
| 
|-
| rowspan="2"|Video of the Year
| "Cellophane"
| 
|-
| 2021
| "sad day"
|
|align="center"|

AIM Independent Music Awards 
The AIM Independent Music Awards, hosted by the Association of Independent Music (AIM), were established in 2011 to recognise artists signed to independent record labels in the United Kingdom. Most of the categories and nominations are selected by an independent judging panel, though some are decided by the public. 
{| class="wikitable" style="width:85%;"
|-
! width=5%|Year
! style="width:40%;"| Category
! style="width:40%;"| Nominated work
! style="width:10%;"| Result
!width=5%|
|-
| rowspan="2"| 2014
| Independent Video of the Year 
| rowspan="2"| "Water Me"
| 
| rowspan="2"| 
|-
| rowspan="2"|Independent Track of the Year 
| 
|-
| rowspan="3"| 2015
| "Two Weeks"
| 
| rowspan="3"| 
|-
| Independent Breakthrough of the year
| rowspan="2"| Herself
| 
|-
| Most Played Independent Act
| 
|-
| rowspan=2|2019
| Independent Track of the Year 
| rowspan=2|"Cellophane"
| 
|rowspan=2|
|-
| Independent Video of the Year
| 
|-
| 2020
| Best Second Album
| Magdalene
| 
|
|-
| rowspan="3"|2022
| Independent Track of the Year
| rowspan="2"| "Tears in the Club" 
| 
| rowspan="3"|
|-
| Independent Video of the Year
| 
|-
| Best Independent EP/Mixtape
| Caprisongs
| 
|-

BBC Sound of...
The Sound of... is an annual BBC poll of music critics and industry figures to find the most promising new music talent.

BET Award 
The BET Awards were established in 2001 by the Black Entertainment Television network to celebrate African Americans and other minorities in music, acting, sports, and other fields of entertainment.

Berlin Music Video Awards
The Berlin Music Video Awards (BMVA) is a festival and networking event for filmmakers, directors, artists, musicians, and music video fans held annually in Berlin, Germany. The four-day event consists of music video marathons, live performances, DJ sets, various workshops, and fashion. The BMVA highlights that anyone can participate - quality, originality and diversity will be rewarded.
{| class="wikitable" style="width:85%;"		
|-
! width=5%|Year
! style="width:40%;"| Category
! style="width:40%;"| Nominated work
! style="width:10%;"| Result
!width=5%|
|-
| 2021
| Best Visual Effects
| "sad day"
| 
| 
|-
| 2022
| Best Editor 
| "Tears in the Club" (with The Weeknd)
| 
|

Billboard Music Awards
The Billboard Music Awards are held to honor artists for commercial performance in the U.S., based on record charts published by Billboard magazine.

Brit Award 
The Brit Awards are the British Phonographic Industry's (BPI) annual pop music awards.

British Fashion Awards 
The Fashion Awards is a ceremony held annually in the United Kingdom since 1989 to showcase both British and international individuals and businesses who have made the most outstanding contributions to the fashion industry during the year.

Glamour Awards 
The Glamour Awards are presented annually by the Glamour magazine to women in a variety of fields.

Grammy Awards 
The Grammy Awards are awarded annually by the National Academy of Recording Arts and Sciences of the United States to recognize outstanding achievement in the music industry.

Note: Jesse Kanda, the art director of LP1 was nominated for Best Recording Package at the 57th Annual Grammy Awards.

Ivor Novello Awards
The Ivor Novello Awards are given by the Ivors Academy to recognize the best in songwriting and composing.

IMPALA Awards 
The Independent Music Companies Association (IMPALA), originally the Independent Music Publishers and Labels Association, is a non-profit trade association established in April 2000 to help European independent record labels represent their agenda and promote independent music. The European Independent Album of the Year Award winner is selected annually by a jury based on artistic merit alone from a nominated shortlist of albums released by a European independent label in the relevant year.

Mercury Prize 
The Mercury Prize, formerly the Mercury Music Prize, is an annual music prize awarded for the best album from the United Kingdom or Ireland.

MTV European Music Awards 
The MTV Europe Music Award (MTV EMA) is an award presented by Viacom International Media Networks to honour artists and music in pop culture. It was originally conceived as an alternative to the MTV Video Music Awards, which are hosted annually in the United States.

MTV Video Music Awards 
The MTV Video Music Awards were established in the end of the summer of 1984 by MTV to celebrate the top music videos of the year.

MTV Japan Video Music Awards 
The MTV Video Music Awards Japan are the Japanese version of the MTV Video Music Awards. Like the MTV Video Music Awards in the United States, in this event artists are awarded for their songs and videos through online voting from the same channel viewers.

mtvU Woodie Awards 
The mtvU, a division of MTV Networks owned by Viacom, broadcasts a 24-hour television channel available on more than 750 college and university campuses across the United States.

MOBO Awards 
The Music of Black Origin Awards (MOBO), first presented in 1996, are held annually in the United Kingdom to recognise artists of any race or nationality who perform black music and "recognise the outstanding achievements of artists who perform music in genres ranging from Gospel, Jazz, RnB, Soul, Reggae to Hip Hop".

Music Producers Guild Awards

NME Award

Q Awards 
{| class="wikitable" style="width:85%;"	
|-
! width=5%|Year
! style="width:40%;"| Category
! style="width:40%;"| Nominated work
! style="width:10%;"| Result
!width=5%|
|-
| 2019
| Best Track
| "Cellophane"
| 
|

Raindance Film Festival 
{| class="wikitable" style="width:85%;"	
|-
! width=5%|Year
! style="width:40%;"| Category
! style="width:40%;"| Nominated work
! style="width:10%;"| Result
!width=5%|
|-
| 2021
| Best Music Video
| "Don't Judge Me"  
| 
|

UK Music Video Awards

Urban Music Awards

YouTube Music Awards

The Webby Awards

The South Bank Sky Arts Awards

References

FKA Twigs
British music-related lists